An eyecatcher is something artificial that has been placed in the landscape as a focal point to "catch the eye" or gain a viewer's attention. It is used to decorate or ornament landscapes for aesthetic reasons, and are typically found in gardens, parks and the grounds of stately homes. Many of these can be found in various forms.

Devices or objects 
These can be anything but typically they tend to be
boulders
rockery
trees 

Or on a grander scale they can be structures such as a
bridge over a river, a stream or lake as an ornamental feature
conservatory - glasshouses, orangeries, vineries
exedra
folly
gloriettes
grottoes
shell grottos
mausoleums
monopteros
monuments (whether they commemorate anything or just for decoration)
nymphaea
pavilions
reflecting pools
shooting/hunting lodge
summer houses  
temples (ornamental or not, as they may sometimes have more than aesthetic use)

See also 
 List of garden features

Garden features
Landscape architecture